The 56th Baeksang Arts Awards ceremony, organised by Ilgan Sports and JTBC Plus, was held on June 5, 2020, at KINTEX, Ilsanseo-gu, Gyeonggi Province, hosted by Shin Dong-yup, Bae Suzy and Park Bo-gum for the third consecutive year. The annual awards ceremony is one of South Korea's most prestigious award shows, recognizing excellence in film, television, and theatre. The ceremony was initially set for May 1, but was delayed due to the COVID-19 pandemic. It did not invite an on-site audience to prevent the spread of the disease.

The nominations were announced on May 8, 2020. Parasite, which received the most nominations, was nominated in all film-related categories except for Best New Director for which the film does not qualify. For the first time ever, Netflix shows were nominated for the Baeksang Arts Awards, with the film Time to Hunt and the series Kingdom. The Theatre division was also revived for the first time in 19 years, with Baeksang Play, Best Actor and Best Actress added to the existing Best Short Play.

The highest honors of the night, Grand Prize (Daesang), were awarded to director Bong Joon-ho of Parasite in the film division and drama series When the Camellia Blooms in the television division. The candidates for Grand Prize – Film were Bong Joon-ho and Parasite. Bong was quickly selected as the winner due to the huge role he played in the film's success, leaving Parasite winning Best Film on a unanimous vote. The candidates for Grand Prize – Television were When the Camellia Blooms, Mister Trot and Kim Hee-ae of The World of the Married. When the Camellia Blooms was chosen as the winner in the third round of votes. Best Drama was initially won by When the Camellia Blooms, however per Baeksang rule, it went to Hot Stove League, the series with the second highest votes.

Winners and nominees 

 

Winners are listed first, highlighted in boldface, and indicated with a double dagger.
Nominees

Film

Films with multiple wins 
The following films received multiple wins:

Films with multiple nominations 
The following films received multiple nominations:

Television

Television programs with multiple wins 
The following television programs received multiple wins:

Television programs with multiple nominations 
The following television programs received multiple nominations:

Theatre

Special awards

Performers

Notes

References

External links 
  
 

Baeksang
Baeksang
Baeksang Arts Awards
Baek
Baek
2020 in South Korea
Impact of the COVID-19 pandemic on cinema
Impact of the COVID-19 pandemic on television